Haouch Barada    is a village in the  Baalbek District in Baalbek-Hermel Governorate.

History
In 1838, Eli Smith noted  Haush Burada  as a Maronite and "Greek Christian" village in the Baalbek area.

References

Bibliography

External links
Haouch Barada,  Localiban

Populated places in Baalbek District
Maronite Christian communities in Lebanon